The Alpha Terrace Historic District is a historic district in the East Liberty neighborhood of Pittsburgh, Pennsylvania, United States.  The site consists of twenty-five stone rowhouses, which were built between 1889 and 1894 using a heterogeneous mix of Queen Anne and Romanesque revival architectural influences. Until they were subdivided and individually sold in the 1950s, the properties were part of a single block of upper-middle-class rental units; for a time, U.S. Steel leased a number of the homes for use by corporate executives. 

The block was listed on the National Register of Historic Places on July 18, 1985.  In 1979, it was added to the List of Pittsburgh History and Landmarks Foundation Historic Landmarks, and in January 1996, the district was added to the List of City of Pittsburgh historic designations.

References

Historic districts in Pittsburgh
City of Pittsburgh historic designations
Pittsburgh History & Landmarks Foundation Historic Landmarks
Historic districts on the National Register of Historic Places in Pennsylvania
National Register of Historic Places in Pittsburgh